Russell Shank (September 2, 1925 – June 26, 2012) was an American librarian. Shank studied electrical engineering at the University of Washington and earned a bachelor's degree in electrical engineering in 1946. He went on to receive a bachelor's in librarianship in 1949, also from the University of Washington. Shank went on to receive a master's in business administration from the University of Wisconsin and a doctorate in library science from Columbia University. He served as an assistant university librarian at the University of California Berkeley from 1959 to 1964 and was a member of the faculty of the Columbia University library school. Shank was the first director of libraries at the Smithsonian Institution from 1968 to 1977. In 1977, he was named chief librarian at the University of California - Los Angeles (UCLA) until he retired from that position in 1989. He was succeeded by Gloria Werner. Shank was also a professor emeritus in UCLA's Graduate School of Education and Information Studies.

Shank served as President of the American Library Association from 1978 to 1979.  Shank was instrumental in forming FEDLINK (the Federal Library and Information Network) and advocated to make Article 19 of the Universal Declaration of Human Rights part of the American Library Association's policy.

Awards and honors
 Hugh C. Atkinson Memorial Award (1990)
 Freedom to Read Foundation Roll of Honor Award (1990)

See also 
 Smithsonian Libraries
 University of California, Los Angeles Library

References

 

1926 births
2012 deaths
American librarians
Presidents of the American Library Association
Columbia University School of Library Service alumni
Columbia University faculty